Epp Petrone ( Saluveer; from 1995 to 2003, Epp Väljaots; born 20 July 1974 in Viljandi) is an Estonian writer, journalist, blogger, and publisher.

In 2007, she founded the publishing house Petrone Print. The publishing house publishes travel-related "My-series". Each book of this series describes some place in the world. For example, in 2007 she published Minu Ameerika (My America).

2006–2010, she was a member of the party Estonian Greens.

Works
 2000s: several "My-series" books (included in 2007 "Minu Ameerika" ('My America'))
 2008: story: "Roheliseks kasvamine" ('Growing Green')
 2009: children's book "Marta varbad" ('Marta's Toes')
 2010: travelogue "Kas süda on ümmargune?" ('Is the Heart Round?')

References

Living people
1974 births
21st-century Estonian women writers
21st-century Estonian writers
Estonian bloggers
Estonian women bloggers
Estonian publishers (people)
Women travel writers
Estonian women journalists
Estonian women children's writers
University of Tartu alumni
People from Viljandi